Crossoglossa is a genus of flowering plants from the orchid family, Orchidaceae. It contains 26 currently recognized species native to Central America and South America, from Nicaragua to Bolivia.

Crossoglossa acuminatissima Nog.-Sav. & Carnevali - Colombia
Crossoglossa aurantilineata Pupulin - Costa Rica
Crossoglossa barfodii Dodson - Ecuador
Crossoglossa bifida Dressler - Panama
Crossoglossa blephariglottis (Schltr.) Dressler ex Dodson - Panama, Costa Rica
Crossoglossa boylei Dodson - Ecuador
Crossoglossa caulescens (Lindl.) Dodson - Ecuador
Crossoglossa dalessandroi (Dodson) Dodson - Ecuador
Crossoglossa dalstroemii (Dodson) Dodson - Ecuador
Crossoglossa dodsonii R.Vásquez - Bolivia
Crossoglossa elliptica Dressler - Panama
Crossoglossa eustachys (Schltr.) Dressler ex Dodson - Panama, Costa Rica
Crossoglossa exigua (Garay) Nog.-Sav. & G.A.Romero - Colombia
Crossoglossa fratrum (Schltr.) Dressler ex Dodson - Panama, Costa Rica, Nicaragua
Crossoglossa hirtzii Dodson - Ecuador
Crossoglossa kalbreyeriana (Kraenzl.) P.Ortiz  - Colombia
Crossoglossa liparidoides (Finet) Dodson - Ecuador, Peru
Crossoglossa longissima (Kraenzl.) P.Ortiz - Colombia
Crossoglossa nanegalensis Dodson - Ecuador
Crossoglossa neirynckiana Szlach. & Marg. - Ecuador
Crossoglossa pichinchae (Schltr.) Dodson - Ecuador
Crossoglossa polyblephara (Schltr.) Dodson - Colombia
Crossoglossa sotoana Pupulin & Karremans - Costa Rica
Crossoglossa steinii (Dodson) Dodson - Ecuador
Crossoglossa tipuloides (Lindl.) Dodson - Colombia
Crossoglossa topoensis (Mansf.) Dodson - Ecuador

See also 
 List of Orchidaceae genera

References 

 Pridgeon, A.M., Cribb, P.J., Chase, M.A. & Rasmussen, F. eds. (1999). Genera Orchidacearum 1. Oxford Univ. Press.
 Pridgeon, A.M., Cribb, P.J., Chase, M.A. & Rasmussen, F. eds. (2001). Genera Orchidacearum 2. Oxford Univ. Press.
 Pridgeon, A.M., Cribb, P.J., Chase, M.A. & Rasmussen, F. eds. (2003). Genera Orchidacearum 3. Oxford Univ. Press
 Berg Pana, H. 2005. Handbuch der Orchideen-Namen. Dictionary of Orchid Names. Dizionario dei nomi delle orchidee. Ulmer, Stuttgart

External links 

Malaxideae genera
Malaxidinae